Altamira is the ninth soundtrack album by guitarist Mark Knopfler and percussionist Evelyn Glennie, released on 1 April 2016 for electronic download via iTunes and Amazon.com, and was released on CD 22 April 2016 on Virgin EMI Records. The album contains music composed for the 2016 film Altamira, directed by Hugh Hudson. The film is a drama about the discovery of the Cave of Altamira starring Antonio Banderas and Rupert Everett.

Track listing
All music was written by Mark Knopfler, except where indicated.

Personnel

Music
 Caroline Dale – cello
 Michael McGoldrick – flute
 Mark Knopfler – guitar
 Guy Fletcher – harmonium, keyboards
 Christine Pendrill – horn
 Evelyn Glennie – percussion and marimba

Production
 Mark Knopfler – producer
 Guy Fletcher – producer, recording supervisor
 Perry Montague-Mason – string arranger
 Rupert Gregson-Williams – vocal arranger

Charts

References

External links
 

Mark Knopfler soundtracks
Albums produced by Mark Knopfler
Albums produced by Guy Fletcher
2016 soundtrack albums
Drama film soundtracks
Collaborative albums